Noarlunga was an electoral district of the House of Assembly in the Australian state of South Australia from 1857 to 1902.

Noarlunga was also the name of an electoral district of the unicameral South Australian Legislative Council from 1851 until its abolition in 1857, William Peacock being the elected member.

The Noarlunga area is currently represented between the seats of Mawson and Kaurna.

Rural at the time, Noarlunga would now be considered metropolitan.

Members

See also
 Noarlunga (disambiguation)

References 

Former electoral districts of South Australia
1857 establishments in Australia
1902 disestablishments in Australia